Miss Diva 2022 was the 10th anniversary edition of the Miss Diva beauty pageant held on 30th October 2022. At the end of the event, Harnaaz Sandhu crowned Divita Rai as her successor. She will represent India in the Miss Universe 2022 pageant. Ritika Khatnani crowned Pragnya Ayyagari as her successor. She will compete in the Miss Supranational 2023 pageant to represent India. Sonal Kukreja also crowned Ojasvi Sharma as the successor to Liva Miss Popular Choice 2022.

Final results
Color keys

Background
In July 2022, it was announced that the 10th anniversary edition will be celebrated. The competition will be held on 28th August 2022. Winners will be selected from existing pool of candidates that have previously competed at international pageants or at Miss Diva and have done exceptionally well after rigorous rounds of interviews and judging as per Miss Universe and Miss Supranational standards by the organization. 7 days prior to the competition and audience vote will be conducted and the winner will represent Liva as Miss Popular Choice 2022. The event will be glamorous and will be attended by celebs, media teams, reigning Miss Universe and her team.

Red Carpet Attendees 
The following is a list of national and international beauty pageant winners from India, as well as other Bollywood celebrities, who attended the Miss Diva 10th anniversary red carpet.

Pageant Titleholders

International 
 Harnaaz Sandhu – Miss Universe 2021
 Lara Dutta – Miss Universe 2000
 Rohit Khandelwal – Mister World 2016
 Srishti Rana – Miss Asia Pacific 2013

Miss Diva 
 Aditi Hundia – Miss Diva Supranational 2018
 Aishwarya Dhavale – Miss Diva 2015 Finalist
 Alankrita Sahai – Miss Diva Earth 2014
 Hemali Sonii – Miss Diva 2015 Finalist
 Naveli Deshmukh – Miss Diva 2015 2nd runner-up
 Neha Jaiswal – Miss Diva 2020 runner-up
 Nehal Chudasama – Miss Diva Universe 2018
 Noyonita Lodh – Miss Diva Universe 2014
 Peden Ongmu Namgyal – Miss Diva Supranational 2017
 Shefali Sood – Miss Diva Supranational 2019
 Sonal Kukreja – Miss Diva 2021 1st runner-up
 Ritika Khatnani – Miss Diva Supranational 2021
 Vartika Singh – Miss Diva Universe 2019

Femina Miss India 
 Aruna Beniwal – Femina Miss India Rajasthan 2020
 Manika Sheokand – Femina Miss Grand India 2020
 Manya Singh – Femina Miss India 2020 1st runner-up
 Meher Castelino – Femina Miss India Universe 1964
 Rubal Shekhawat – Femina Miss India 2022 1st runner-up
 Ruhi Singh – Femina Miss India United Nations 2012
 Sangeeta Motilal Bijlani – Femina Miss India Universe 1980
 Shivani Jadhav – Femina Miss Grand India 2019
 Sini Sadanand Shetty – Femina Miss India World 2022
 Suman Rao – Femina Miss India World 2019
 Tanushree Dutta – Femina Miss India Universe 2004

Mister India 
 Rahul Rajasekharan – Mister India Supranational 2020

Other Celebrities 
 Alesia Raut – Rampwalk Expert
 Anjali Raut – Rampwalk Expert
 Mouni Roy – Bollywood Actress
 Natasha Bharadwaj – Bollywood Actress

Nominees
The following are the nominees for Miss Diva Supranational and Liva Miss Popular Choice 2022:
Color key

Crossovers
Contestants who previously competed in previous editions of Liva Miss Diva and other local and international beauty pageants with their respective placements.

National pageants 
Miss Diva
 2021: Divita Rai (2nd Runner Up)
 2021: Ojaswi Sharma
Femina Miss India 2022
 Chhattisgarh: Sifat Sehgal (Top 10)
 Himachal Pradesh: Amisha Thakur (Top 10)
 Meghalaya: Gargee Nandy (Top 5)
 Telangana: Pragnya Ayyagari (Top 5)

Notes

References 

2022 beauty pageants
2022 in India
Miss Diva